King Borommarachathirat I or King Borom Rachathirat I, also known as Khunluang Pha Ngua; 1370–1388), was the third king of Ayutthaya Kingdom.

As the lord of Suphanburi, a powerful rival of Ayutthaya, he forced King Ramesuan from power and took the throne of Ayutthaya. Known as a great warrior, his reign marked the expansion of Ayutthaya to the north. He suppressed a rebellion in Sukhothai Kingdom (1371-78) and subjugated major northern powers such as Phitsanuloke. Invading Chiengmai, his forces were defeated and repulsed at the Battle of Sen Sanuk, near Chiengmai. 

After his death in 1388, his son, Thong Lan reigned for only a week. Ramesuan, who had previously retreated to Lavo, returned and toppled him. Ramesuan eventually assumed the throne, as the king for the second time.

References

Suphannaphum dynasty
Kings of Ayutthaya
1388 deaths
Year of birth unknown
14th-century monarchs in Asia
14th-century Thai people